The redtail barb (Enteromius gurneyi) is a species of cyprinid fish endemic to KwaZulu Natal in South Africa.

Footnotes 

redtail barb
Freshwater fish of South Africa
Endemic fish of South Africa
redtail barb
redtail barb